Klaus Fischer (born 1949) is a German football player and coach.

Klaus Fischer may also refer to:

Klaus Fischer (mathematician) (1943–2009), American mathematician

See also
Klaus Fischer-Dieskau (1921–1994), German church musician